District of Teresópolis is a district of the city of Teresópolis. The district is composed of 46 neighborhoods. Its total population is 146,207 inhabitants.

Teresópolis